Real... En Vivo is the 24th album and fifth live album by Puerto Rican singer Ednita Nazario. It was recorded live in the Coliseo de Puerto Rico, with over 60,000 in attendance. The show featured artists Ricky Martin and Tommy Torres performing classics with Nazario. The album debuted on Billboard 200 Albums at #57 selling over 8,658 in its first week.

Track listings 
CD Track Listing
 Después De Tí - 03:38
 No Me Dejes No (Give A Little Bit)/La Última Vez/Eres Libre - 06:34
 Real - 05:28
 Alguien Más - 03:45
 Mi Corazón Tiene Mente Propia/Como Antes - 04:14
 Todavía - 03:22
 Puedo - 04:25
 Tu Sabes Bien (feat. Tommy Torres) - 03:55
 Cuando No Te Queden Lágrimas - 04:39
 Química Ideal (feat. Ricky Martin) - 04:43
 No - 04:04
 No Te Mentía - 03:48

DVD Track Listing
 Después de Ti
 Espiritu Libre
 Más Mala Que Tu / A Que Pides Más
 No Me Dejes No / La Ultima Vez / Eres Libre
 Real
 Alguien Más
 Mi Corazon Tiene Mente Propia / Como Antes
 Pienso En Ti
 Todavia 
 Puedo 
 Me Quedo
 Tu Sabes Bien / Pegadito
 Days Of Innocences
 Cuando No Te Queden Lagrimas
 Química Ideal
 No 
 Vengada
 Si No Me Amas / La Prohibida / Aprenderé
 No Te Mentia
 Mas Grande Que Grande

Charts

Awards

Billboard Latin Music Awards

References 

Ednita Nazario live albums
Live video albums
2008 video albums
2008 live albums
Spanish-language live albums